Volchok is a surname. Notable people with the surname include:

Igor Volchok (1931–2016), Russian football manager
Zollie Volchok (1916–2012), American businessman and basketball executive

Fictional characters
Kevin Volchok, character in The O.C.

See also